The following is a List of hospitals in Russia.  The list includes links to notable hospital articles.

Hospitals
There were 5,300 hospitals in Russia in 2018.  The earliest Russian hospitals were established in the 18th century.  The hospitals listed in the table below are some of the notable hospitals in Russia during its history. The table includes the name, city in which the hospital is located, year the hospital was established, pertinent comments and references.  Many hospitals have more complete articles in the Russian Wikipedia.

See also
 :Category:Hospital ships of the Soviet Union and Russia
 List of Russian Fleet hospital ships
 Healthcare in Russia
 History of hospitals
 Hospitals
 Psikhushka, Russian ironic diminutive for Psychiatric hospital
 Category:Russian hospitals by city on Russian Wikipedia

References

Russia
List
Hospitalsi
Russia
Russia
Hospitals